Who Are They, These Rock Stars? is a live video album by the rock band You Am I, which was recorded by Triple J at the launch of their seventh album, Convicts. It place at the Sydney Royal Mint and was a themed event, with the crowd invited to attend in Victorian clothing. The event was hosted by Triple J's Robbie Buck with an introduction by 'Governor' Tex Perkins, both of whom were also suitably attired. The DVD also features two music videos released after the band's previous DVD, The Cream & The Crock, as well as two photo galleries and an exclusive interview shot on the set of the "It Ain't Funny How We Don't Talk Anymore" music video.

At the ARIA Music Awards of 2007, the release won ARIA Award for Best Music DVD.

Track listing

Live at the Mint 

 Gunslingers
 Friends Like You
 The Sweet Life
 Baby Clothes
 Mr Milk
 Cathy's Clown
 It Ain't Funny How We Don't Talk Anymore
 Berlin Chair
 By My Own Hand
 Good Mornin'
 A Nervous Kid
 How Much Is Enough
 Constance George
 Thank God I've Hit the Bottom
 Trouble

Bonus material 

 It Ain't Funny How We Don't Talk Anymore (music video)
 Friends Like You (music video)
 Interview (2006)
 It Ain't Funny How We Don't Talk Anymore (photo gallery)
 Friends Like You (photo gallery)

References

You Am I video albums